Dietfurt railway station is a railway station in Bütschwil-Ganterschwil, in the Swiss canton of St. Gallen. It is an intermediate stop on the Wil–Ebnat-Kappel line and is served by local trains only.

Services 
Dietfurt is served by the S9 of the St. Gallen S-Bahn:

 : half-hourly service from Wattwil to Wil.

References

External links 
 
 

Railway stations in the canton of St. Gallen
Swiss Federal Railways stations